John Edward Burton III (born October 25, 1961) is an American former professional stock car racing driver. He has five career wins in the NASCAR Winston Cup Series, including the 2002 Daytona 500 and the 2001 Southern 500. He is the older brother of fellow NASCAR driver and NASCAR on NBC broadcaster Jeff Burton, the father of current NASCAR Xfinity Series driver Jeb Burton, and the uncle of current NASCAR Cup Series driver Harrison Burton. He currently operates the Ward Burton Wildlife Foundation, a conservation and sportsmans' organization.

NASCAR Busch Series career
Burton began his NASCAR Busch Series career in the 1990 season and competed full-time for four seasons. In his first season, he had 23 starts with three Top 10 finishes, ending the season in 21st place. His results improved steadily over the next three years. For his second season, he had 29 starts with two Top 5 finishes and 10 Top 10 finishes, completing the season in 18th place.

Burton's third season in 1992 brought his first win on February 29 at Rockingham in the number 27 Gwaltney car owned by Alan Dillard. He completed the season in eighth place overall with one win, three Top 5 finishes and 10 Top 10 finishes. His final full-time season in 1993 brought three more wins, nine Top’s 5, and 10 Top 10’s, ending up in sixth place in the final points standings.

In 1995, Burton started driving for Buz McCall in the No. 95 Caterpillar, Inc.-sponsored Chevrolet after John Tanner was released. He drove for Bill Davis Racing in 1996 for eight starts in the No. 22 MBNA-sponsored Pontiac.

Burton did not start another Busch Series race until 1999 when he ran five more races for Bill Davis with a sponsorship from Siemens. He accumulated three Top 5 and five Top 10 finishes including a second-place finish at Dover International Speedway. He also ran one race for Innovative Motorsports and their No. 47 Chevrolet.

In 2000, Burton ran five more races for Davis with a sponsorship from Polaris Industries and one race with Innovative Motorsports. He then ran two races in 2001 for Tommy Baldwin Jr.'s new team with a Pillsbury sponsorship.

On January 2, 2007 Brewco Motorsports Inc. announced Burton would drive the No. 27 Kleenex-sponsored Ford Fusion in the Busch Series in 2007. Burton was to drive 20 races for Brewco Motorsports and Kleenex, beginning with the Orbitz 300 at Daytona International Speedway. He was released late in the season.

NASCAR Cup career

1994–1999
Burton moved up to the Winston Cup Series in 1994. He ran 26 of 31 races in the No. 31 Hardee's-sponsored Chevy for A.G. Dillard Motorsports, winning his first career pole at Charlotte Motor Speedway and finishing 35th in standings. He returned to the No. 31 ride in 1995 but he was released on August 20, one day after finishing 6th at Michigan. The next weekend at Bristol, he moved to the No. 22 Bill Davis Racing MBNA-sponsored Pontiac after 21 races, and he won the AC-Delco 400 at Rockingham toward the end of that season.

Caterpillar became the new primary sponsor for the car in 1999, when he picked up a career high 9th-place points finish, with 6 top five finishes and 16 top ten finishes. He scored three second place finishes that season, at Las Vegas, Darlington and Rockingham, and on all three occasions brother Jeff won the race.

2000–2007
In the 2000 season, he won the Mall.com 400 at Darlington Raceway and had seventeen Top 10 finishes to finish 10th in the final points standings. Bill Davis Racing switched to Dodge in the next season, when he won the Mountain Dew Southern 500 at Darlington Raceway and had ten Top 10 finishes to finish 14th in the final points standings. Burton had also led the most laps in that year's Daytona 500 but retired after 173 laps after having been involved in the Big One.

In the 2002 Daytona 500, Burton drove among the lead cars and was among the lead pack late in the race. However, he took the lead because Sterling Marlin, who was in front of him at the time, climbed out of his car and tried to fix a damaged right-front fender during a red flag, drawing a penalty as repairs are prohibited during red flag conditions except for non-points paying races. As Marlin was sent to the back of the field at the restart, Burton inherited the lead and maintained it, holding off Elliott Sadler and Geoffrey Bodine for the win.

He also won the New England 300 at New Hampshire but due to numerous mechanical failures, he fell to 25th in the point standings, but after his win in Loudon, however, 2002 would mark the first and only time in his career that he would win multiple races in a single season. At Bristol, he was involved in a wreck where he threw his brakepads at Dale Earnhardt Jr. for wrecking him in turn 3 late in the race.

2003 was a season of poorer finishes for Burton. He only had four Top 10s, and he left Bill Davis Racing with four races left in the season to begin driving the No. 0 NetZero-sponsored Pontiac for Haas CNC Racing. He finished the season 21st in the final points standings.

In the 2004 season, Burton raced Haas CNC Racing's No. 0 NetZero HiSpeed-sponsored car to three Top 10 finishes but was released from the team with two races left in the season. He spent the next two seasons as a free agent. He returned to the Sprint Cup series late in the 2006 season, driving the No. 4 Lucas Oil-sponsored Chevrolet for Morgan-McClure Motorsports. His first race with the team was the Subway 500 at Martinsville Speedway on October 22, 2006. He started 35th and finished 26th as the last car on the lead lap. On November 5, 2006 at Texas Motor Speedway in his next driving opportunity, he started 37th and finished 25th. On December 12, Burton signed with Morgan-McClure Motorsports to drive the No. 4 car full-time in 2007. That year, his performance was lackluster, posting a best finish of 14th. On November 12, he was released from Morgan-McClure Motorsports so that the team could "evaluate performance." Morgan-McClure closed up shop shortly afterward.

Following his release, Burton did not officially retire; however, it was not until 2012 that he returned to NASCAR, signing with Hillman Racing to run in the season-opening Camping World Truck Series race at Daytona International Speedway, as well as selected races later in the year as a teammate to his son Jeb.

Burton joined Turner Scott Motorsports as a driver coach for the team starting in 2013, where he assisted with driver development for the Nationwide and Camping World Truck Series teams. However, just prior to the start of the 2014 season, the primary sponsor of the team defaulted on a payment, and the team was shut down.

Virginia Board of Game and Inland Fisheries

On November 1, 2005, then Virginia Governor Mark R. Warner appointed Burton to the Virginia Board of Game and Inland Fisheries. As a resident of Halifax County, Virginia, Burton assumed the seat on the board for Virginia's 5th Congressional District that was formerly held by C. Wilson McNeely, IV, who resigned after six years of service.

Burton, an avid sportsman and conservationist, is the founder and president of the Ward Burton Wildlife Foundation, and he has been a spokesperson for Virginia's 34 state parks since 2003.

Further achievements in conservation
The Governor's Environmental Excellence Award, 2008.
Honorary co-leader of the Virginia Natural History Museum in Martinsville fundraising efforts.
Partner with the Natural Resources Conservation Service to create awareness for the need to protect and create additional wetlands in America.
Involved with the 4-H clubs in Alabama and Virginia through PSAs and assisting 4-H clubs to conduct wildlife enhancement programs on Foundation land.

Personal life
Burton was born in Danville, Virginia but considers South Boston, Virginia his hometown. Burton and his wife, Tabitha, have three children: Jeb, Sarah, and Ashton. His nephew is Alexander Burton. He owns several thousand acres of hunting land in rural Virginia close to his hometown of South Boston, Virginia.  He also has a home in Nags Head, North Carolina.

Burton's family ancestry can be traced back through Colonial Virginia where the landing of his earliest ancestor Richard Burton came over to the Jamestown Colony. He currently serves as a member of the Board of Directors for the Patrick Henry Memorial Foundation in Brookneal, Virginia.

Motorsports career results

NASCAR
(key) (Bold – Pole position awarded by qualifying time. Italics – Pole position earned by points standings or practice time. * – Most laps led.)

Nextel Cup Series

Daytona 500

Busch Series

Camping World Truck Series

References

The Unauthorized NASCAR Fan Guide 1998–99, by Bill Fleischman and Al Pearce (1999)
wardburton.com

External links

 
 
 The Ward Burton Wildlife Foundation

Living people
1961 births
People from South Boston, Virginia
Racing drivers from Virginia
NASCAR drivers
American conservationists
Caterpillar Inc. people
Stewart-Haas Racing drivers